"Silent Treatment" is a song written and recorded by American country music artist Earl Thomas Conley. It was released in November 1980 as the first single from the album Fire & Smoke.  The song reached number 7 on the Billboard Hot Country Singles & Tracks chart.

Chart performance

References

1981 singles
1980 songs
Earl Thomas Conley songs
Songs written by Earl Thomas Conley
RCA Records singles